Moving Notes Kelvin Tan is Kelvin Tan's 3rd solo album in Singapore.

Track listing

Original CD Edition
The original edition of the disc was released on 9 August 2009 in Singapore

CD
 孤单好吗 How Are You, Loneliness
 永远的朋友 Forever Friends
 星光伴我心 Stars With My Heart
 心有灵犀 Telepathy
 分手的情书 Break Up Letter
 和你同名的星星 Same Star
 圆规 Divider
 宁愿 I'd Rather
 寂寞之国 Lonely City
 重生 Reborn
 大海 The Big Sea
 就在这里 Right Here (Bonus Track: Singapore's National Day 09 Chinese Version of Theme Song)

References

Kelvin Tan albums
2009 albums